Seth Berglee is an American politician. He serves as a Republican member of the Montana House of Representatives.

Berglee was born in Brockton, Montana and attended Montana State University and Ohio State University. He currently resides in Silesia, Montana and practices Christianity.

References

Living people
Republican Party members of the Montana House of Representatives
Year of birth missing (living people)
Montana State University alumni
Ohio State University alumni
21st-century American politicians